The Nustar Fire was a fuel storage fire and wildfire at the NuStar Energy facility in Crockett, California, which started about 2:00 PM on 15 October 2019.  By 9:00 PM the same evening, the fire was contained, though two tanks of ethanol were still burning.  About 15 acres burned.

The ATF and other agencies investigated the cause of the fuel tank explosions.  There is some speculation that the event might have been related to a nearby earthquake 15 hours earlier.

On 22 October it was reported that the Nustar Fire was provoking opposition to an expansion of the Phillips 66 refinery tank farm adjacent to the NuStar facility, in Rodeo.

As of 25 October 2019 (10 days after the fire), two ships delivering imported ethanol were stuck without a place to unload, since the NuStar terminal was the only terminal in the San Francisco area set up to receive ethanol, and was shut down by the state while they investigated the fire.

On 27 October, another fire, the Sky Fire, threatened Crockett, burning another 150 acres along Cummings Skyway.  Most of the town and the NuStar facility were evacuated.  The Sky Fire was extinguished on 28 October.

According to the 30-day interim report on the Nustar fire submitted to the Contra Costa Hazardous Materials Programs by Shore Terminals LLC:

A final report from the Contra Costa County Fire Protection District was completed and presented May 21, 2021.  It concluded the first tank explosion was probably caused by an electric fault that ignited an ethanol vapor air mixture in the headspace of the tank.  Improper grounding was observed as well as a pallet removed from the vapor line PRV after a 2012 incident.  The second tank was damaged by debris from the first explosion.

References

Fires in California
2019 California wildfires
October 2019 events in the United States
2019 fires in the United States
2019 in California
Contra Costa County, California
Wildfires in Contra Costa County, California